Nationality words link to articles with information on the nation's poetry or literature (for instance, Irish or France).

Events

Works published

United Kingdom
 Anonymous, A Rap at the Rhapsody (a response to Jonathan Swift's On Poetry 1733)
 Jean Adam, Miscellany Poems
 John Arbuthnot and others, Gnothi Seauton: Know Yourself, published anonymously
 Mary Barber, Poems on Several Occasions
 Isaac Hawkins Browne, the elder, On Design and Beauty, published anonymously
 Robert Dodsley, An Epistle to Mr. Pope
 Stephen Duck, Truth and Falsehood
 William Dunkin:
 The Lover's Web
 The Poet's Prayer
 Richard Lewis (poet), Upon Prince Madoc's Expedition to the Country now called America, in the 12th Century, a fictional, poetic tale of a Welshman; English Colonial America
 Lady Mary Wortley Montagu, The Dean's Provocation for Writing the Lady's Dressing-Room, published anonymously (see Jonathan Swift's The Lady's Dressing-Room 1732)
 Alexander Pope:
 An Epistle to Lord Cobham, published this year, although the book states "1733"
 An Essay on Man, fourth and final epistle (Epistles 1–3 published 1733; all four epistles also published together this year), published anonymously
 The First Satire of the Second Book of Horace including the Second Satire of the Second Book of Horace, which was published separately this year (preceded by First Satire of Horace 1733)
 Sober Advice From Horace, published anonymously, parallel texts in English and Latin
 James Thomson, Liberty, dedicated to the Prince of Wales
 Jonathan Swift, A Beautiful Young Nymph Going to Bed, published anonymously
 Robert Tatersal, The Bricklayer's Miscellany; or, Poems on Several Subjects
 Joseph Trapp, Thoughts Upon the Four Last Things, published anonymously, in four parts (Death, Judgment, Heaven, Hell), starting this year and ending in 1735

Other
 Jean-Baptiste Gresset, Vert-Vert, (some sources give the year of publication as 1733) France

Births
Death years link to the corresponding "[year] in poetry" article:
 April 10 – Eleonore von Grothaus (died 1794), German poet
 July 15 – Evan Lloyd (died 1776), Welsh satirical poet
 July 25 – Ueda Akinari, 上田 秋成, also known as "Ueda Shūsei" (died 1809), Japanese author, scholar and waka poet (surname: Udea)
 September 29 – William Julius Mickle (died 1788), Scottish poet
 December 15 – John Maclaurin (died 1796), Scottish judge and poet
 December 21 – Francisco Manoel de Nascimento (died 1819), Portuguese poet
 Also – Hedvig Sirenia (died 1795), Swedish woman poet and translator (died 1795)

Deaths
Birth years link to the corresponding "[year] in poetry" article:
 February 28 (or 1733) – John Morgan (born 1688), Welsh-born clergyman, scholar and poet
 Edward Littleton, English clergyman and poet

See also

 Poetry
 List of years in poetry
 List of years in literature
 18th century in poetry
 18th century in literature
 Augustan poetry
 Scriblerus Club

Notes

 "A Timeline of English Poetry" Web page of the Representative Poetry Online Web site, University of Toronto

18th-century poetry
Poetry